Ağacqala (also, Ağaçqala and Agachkala) is a village and municipality in the Tovuz Rayon of Azerbaijan.  It has a population of 334.

References 

Populated places in Tovuz District